The C series is a line of pickup trucks sold by Dodge from 1954 until 1960. It replaced the Dodge B series of trucks and was eventually supplanted by the Dodge D series, introduced in 1961. Unlike the B series, which were closely related to Dodge's prewar trucks, the C series was a complete redesign. Dodge continued the "pilot house" tradition of high-visibility cabs with a wraparound windshield introduced in 1955. A two-speed "PowerFlite" automatic transmission was newly available that year. The Dodge Town Panel and Town Wagon also used the new design.

Chrysler called the Hemi-powered Dodge trucks "Power Giant" in 1957, and introduced power steering and brakes, a three-speed automatic, and a 12-volt electrical system. From 1957 to 1959, Dodge offered the Sweptside pickup, a rival to the Chevrolet Cameo Carrier, but it never became a bestseller. A flat-sided (and thus wider) "Sweptline" cargo box came in 1959. The company also adopted the standard pickup truck numbering scheme, also used by Ford and GM at that time. Thus, the ½ ton Dodge was now called the D100.

Four wheel drive W-Series Power Wagons

Starting in the 1957 model year, factory four wheel drive versions of the Dodge C Series trucks were produced and sold as the W-100, W-200, W-300, and W-500, alongside the older WDX/WM-300 "Military Style"  Dodge Power Wagon. The pickups had the "Power Wagon" badge on the fender. The heavy duty four wheel drive W-300 and W-500 trucks were marketed as "Power Giants".

Engines
1957-1960; Flathead I6, 
1959; 331 in³ FirePower V8, 
1957-1959; 315 in³ Red Ram V8, 
1959; 318 in³ A-type V8,

Gallery

Medium-duty/heavy-duty C series

Since it still used the older cab design, the C series name was continued for Dodge's line of medium- and heavy-duty trucks (better known as the LCF series) through the 1975 model year, long after most of Dodge's other trucks had moved to the newer D series designation.

Four Wheel Drive also utilized C series cabs for many of its medium- and heavy-duty trucks; however, because Chrysler needed plant capacity for its newer light-duty truck models, manufacture of these later C series cabs — for both Dodge and FWD — was outsourced to Checker in Kalamazoo, MI.

References

External links

Pickup Trucks.com
Dodge Trucks History: 1954 to 1955 C-series pickups
Dodge Trucks History: 1957 to 1960 Power Giant pickups
1957-1959 Dodge D100 sweptside pickup

C series
Pickup trucks
Rear-wheel-drive vehicles
Cars introduced in 1954
1960s cars